The 2000–01 season was Football Club Internazionale Milano's 92nd in existence and 85th consecutive season in the top flight of Italian football.

Season overview
Inter hoped to improve from past seasons; the goalkeeper Angelo Peruzzi was replaced by a young Sébastien Frey (aged 20), while a defender - Fabio Macellari - did the same with Grigorios Georgatos who came from Greece. The burden of scoring was given to Hakan Şükür and Robbie Keane, waiting for Vieri's recovery and Ronaldo's return. Inter did not pass the Champions League preliminary round: they were defeated by Helsingborgs, losing on a 1–0 aggregate. The side then lost the Supercoppa Italiana, defeated 4–3 by Lazio. Coach Lippi lost instead his job in October, after the 2–1 defeat to Reggina in Serie A.

His place was taken by Marco Tardelli, who achieved up and down results. In the rest of season Inter suffered further blows: a 6–1 defeat to Parma and a second European flop, against Alavés in the UEFA Cup. Inter supporters flew off the handle when, during a match with Atalanta, when they threw a scooter from the stands. On following matchday, the side lost again: Milan won 6–0 in the Derby della Madonnina. Inter finished the league in fifth place with 51 points, two more than rivals Milan.

First-team squad
Squad at the end of season

Transfers

Winter

Reserve squad
The following players did not appear for the first-team this season.

Competitions

Supercoppa

Serie A

League table

Results by round

Matches

UEFA Champions League

Third Preliminary round

UEFA Cup

First round

Second round

Third round

Eightfinals

Coppa Italia

Eightfinals

Quarterfinals

Statistics

Appearances and goals
As of 31 June 2001

References

Inter Milan seasons
Internazionale